The Battle of Block Island was a naval skirmish which took place in the waters off Rhode Island during the American Revolutionary War. The Continental Navy under the command of Commodore Esek Hopkins was returning from a successful raid on Nassau when it encountered , a Royal Navy dispatch boat.

Glasgow escaped from the fleet of seven ships, although it sustained significant damage, and the battle is considered a victory for the British. Several captains of the Continental fleet were criticized for their actions during the battle, and one was eventually dismissed as a result. Commodore Hopkins was criticized for other actions pertaining to the cruise, including the distribution of seized goods, and was also dismissed.

Background
 was a sixth-rate 20-gun frigate of the Royal Navy.  In early April 1776 under the command of Capt. Tryingham Howe, it was carrying dispatches from Newport, Rhode Island to the British fleet off Charleston, South Carolina. This fleet had been assembled to launch an assault on Charleston, which ultimately failed in the June Battle of Sullivan's Island.

The Second Continental Congress had established the Continental Navy in late 1775.  By February 1776, the first ships of the fleet were ready for their maiden voyage. Commodore Esek Hopkins was to lead a fleet of eight ships on an expedition to the Bahamas, where the British were known to have military stores. In early March, the fleet landed marines on the island of New Providence and captured the town of Nassau. The fleet sailed north on March 17, now including two captured prize ships, all loaded up with cargo captured from military stores. One ship was dispatched to Philadelphia, while the rest of the fleet sailed for the Block Island channel. The fleet's cruise was marked by outbreaks of a variety of diseases, including fevers and smallpox, which significantly reduced the crew's effectiveness.

By April 4, the fleet reached the waters off Long Island and proceeded to capture , which was also laden with supplies. The next day brought a second prize in the Bolton. Hopkins continued to cruise off Block Island that night, hoping to catch more easy prizes. He organized the fleet into a scouting formation of two columns. The right or eastern column was headed by USS Cabot and was followed by Hopkins' flagship USS Alfred, which had 20 guns and was the largest ship of the fleet. The left column was headed by the USS Andrew Doria and was followed by USS Columbus. Behind these came USS Providence, with USS Fly and USS Wasp trailing farther behind as escorts for the prizes. The need to provide crews for the prize ships further reduced the fighting effectiveness of the fleet.

Battle

The battle took place on an exceptionally clear night with a nearly full moon. USS Andrew Doria and HMS Glasgow spotted each other between 1:00 and 2:00 am on April 6, about eight leagues (20 to 24 nautical miles) southeast of Block Island with the fleet headed in a generally southerly direction. Glasgow was heading west, destined for Charleston. Captain Howe came about to investigate the fleet and closed to within hailing distance over the next 30 minutes. Commodore Hopkins gave no signals during this time, so the fleet formed no battle line. This resulted in a battle that Captain Nicholas Biddle of Andrew Doria later described as "helter-skelter".

Howe first came upon USS Cabot, whose captain was Esek Hopkins' son John. Glasgow hailed Cabot for identification, to which the younger Hopkins replied, "The USS Columbus and USS Alfred, a 22-gun frigate." An overzealous seaman on his ship then tossed a grenade onto Glasgows deck and the battle was engaged. Cabot, a lightly armed brig, fired one ineffective broadside of six-pound cannon shot. Glasgow countered with two broadsides from its heavier weaponry, killing Cabot master, wounding Hopkins, and disabling the ship's steering. As Cabot drifted away, USS Alfred came up to engage Glasgow and the two commenced a broadside duel. A shot from Glasgow early in the action broke the lines to Alfred tiller, causing her to lose steering and exposing her to raking fire. Her drift also made it difficult for Biddle's Andrew Doria to join the action, because the ship also had to maneuver to avoid the drifting Cabot. USS Providence held back; USS Columbus was able to join the action late, but her fire was so wild that little to no damage was done to Glasgow.

However, Glasgow was now exposed to fire from three ships, so Howe decided to break off the battle, in order to avoid being boarded, and made sail for Newport. Despite extensive damage to the sail and rigging, he pulled away from the pursuing fleet, which was fully laden with its captured goods. Hopkins called off the chase after several hours in order to avoid an encounter with the British squadron at Newport. His only prize was Glasgow tender, which the fleet brought to anchor in New London, Connecticut on April 8.

Aftermath
HMS Glasgow suffered one killed and three wounded, a low number which some consider to be evidence of poor quality in the Continental fleet's gunnery; all of the casualties were due to musket fire. Four were killed and seven wounded aboard Cabot; USS Alfred had six killed and six wounded, and Andrew Dorias drummer was wounded.

Continental Congress President John Hancock praised Hopkins for the fleet's performance, while its failure to capture Glasgow provided opportunities for criticism to opponents of the Navy, both in and out of Congress. Nicholas Biddle wrote of the action, "A more imprudent, ill-conducted affair never happened." USS Columbus captain Abraham Whipple endured accusations of cowardice for a time, and eventually asked for a court martial to clear his name. On May 6, 1776, a panel consisting of officers who had been on the cruise cleared Whipple of cowardice but criticized him for errors in judgment. USS Providence captain John Hazard was not so fortunate; he was charged with a variety of offenses by his subordinate officers, including neglect of duty during the Glasgow action. He was convicted by court martial and forced to surrender his commission.

Commodore Hopkins came under scrutiny from Congress over matters unrelated to the Block Island action. He had violated his written orders to sail to Virginia and the Carolinas, traveling to Nassau instead. He also distributed the goods taken during the cruise in Connecticut and Rhode Island without consulting Congress. He was censured for these transgressions.  A number of the fleet's ships suffered from crew shortages and became trapped at Providence, Rhode Island by the British occupation of Newport late in 1776 and, thus, failed to sail again. In January 1778, Hopkins was dismissed from the Navy.

HMS Glasgow returned to Newport, suffering from the battle and having dumped her dispatches. She was found to be in bad shape; she was made as seaworthy as possible and sent to Portsmouth for repairs. Her mission was reassigned to HMS Nautilus, another ship in the Newport squadron.

See also
 American Revolutionary War §Early Engagements. ‘Battle of Block Island’ placed in overall sequence and strategic context.

Notes

References

 (reprints Howe's report)

Block Island
Continental Navy
Block Island
Block